The 1947–48 Dartmouth Indians men's ice hockey season was the 42nd season of play for the program but first under the oversight of the NCAA. The Indians represented Dartmouth College and were coached by Eddie Jeremiah, in his 8th season.

Season
With the NCAA instituting a national tournament for the first time for this season, Dartmouth was expected to be one of the two teams selected from the east for the competition. The Indians had won the last four eastern intercollegiate titles contested (one tied) and still boasted many of the players that had helped earn those championships. While the did lose scoring star Jack Riley to graduation, his place in the lineup was filled ably by brother Joe Riley, a transfer from the defunct program at Illinois. Joe was teamed with middle brother and team captain Bill Riley and Bob Merriam to form one of the top scoring lines in the nation and keep Dartmouth atop the college hockey landscape. The defense was also a strength of the team, led by Crawford Campbell and Bob Thayer, while Dick Desmond took on the role as the starter in goal.

After narrowly escaping Boston University in the season opener, Dartmouth settled in and reeled off several dominating victories. During the winter break the club headed to Buffalo and ran roughshod over the other three teams assembled. The Indians ran their hot start to a 7–0 mark before Boston College dented their record. The narrow defeat seemed to spur the team and they responded with several overpowering performances. The greens were, however, able to get their revenge against the Eagles in the rematch and continued their winning ways for the rest of the regular season.

Dartmouth reeled off 13 consecutive wins to finish their slate of game with a 20–1 record and were the obvious choice as the top eastern representative. However, before the beginning of the tournament, Dartmouth still had a few game to play. After the annual alumni game, the Indians headed up to Toronto to take on the eastern Canadian champions, the Toronto Varsity Blues. The northerners handed Dartmouth its worst defeat in eight years and shut out the Indians for the first time since February of 1941. Just three days later, the team was in Colorado Springs and having to fight through both fatigue and a mile-high altitude as well as a strong Colorado College outfit. Dartmouth's scorers were not deterred and the team doubled up the nation's top offense to advance to the first national championship game in history.

The final game of the season pitted the top teams from each region and Dartmouth would have its hands full against Michigan. While the Wolverines weren't quite as productive on the offensive side as the Indians, their defense was possibly the best in the nation. The title tilt was kicked off by Michigan gaining a lead just 50 seconds into the game. Bill Riley tied the game shortly thereafter and the two then traded goals before the end of the first period to leave the score at 2-all. Dartmouth scored twice in the second period to take a 2-goal lead just past the midway point of the game. With everything appearing to break in the Indians' favor, the second half of the game turned into a tragedy for the greens.

Michigan cut the lead in half with five minutes remaining in the second. Just over a minute later, Gordon McMillan tied the score but the play was whistled down. Just prior to the goal, Al Renfrew had finished serving a penalty and had returned to the ice rather than his team's bench, as was required by some rules at the time. The referees decided to nullify the goal and the period ended 4–3 in Dartmouth's favor, however, Michigan's coach, Vic Heyliger protested during the intermission. The NCAA rules committee conferred and decided to reverse the decision, officially awarding Michigan the goal and leaving the two tied going into the third. While its unknown how this turn of events affected the team, it was the Wolverines' offense that provided the biggest turning point in the match. Michigan went on a tear in the final frame, scoring three times in the first seven minutes. Dartmouth was unable to respond and all of the shots they fired on goal were turned aside. Michigan finished the game on a 6-goal run and captured the inaugural national championship, much to the chagrin of the Dartmouth faithful.

Roster

Standings

Schedule and results

|-
!colspan=12 style=";" | Regular Season

|-
!colspan=12 style=";" |

National championship game

Michigan vs. Dartmouth

Scoring statistics

Note: Only sparse goaltending statistics are available.

References

1947-48
Dartmouth
Dartmouth
Dartmouth
Dartmouth